The 2021 Philippine Golf Tour, titled as the 2021 ICTSI Philippine Golf Tour for sponsorship reasons, was the 13th season of the Philippine Golf Tour, the main professional golf tour in the Philippines since it was formed in 2009.

Schedule
The following table lists official events during the 2021 season.

Notes

References

Philippine Golf Tour
Philippine Golf Tour